Siddhanth Kapoor (born 6 July 1984) is an Indian actor and assistant director who works in Bollywood films. Son of actor Shakti Kapoor and brother of actress Shraddha Kapoor, he started his career by working as an assistant director in various films such as the 2007 comedy horror Bhool Bhulaiya, the 2006 comedy murder mystery Bhagam Bhag, the 2006 comedy drama Chup Chup Ke and the 2007 comedy Dhol. He then started acting in Sanjay Gupta's crime film Shootout at Wadala (2013) and later featured in Anurag Kashyap's psychological thriller film Ugly (2014).

Early life and career
Kapoor was born in Mumbai on 6 July 1984 to actor Shakti Kapoor and Shivangi Kolhapure. His ancestry is Marathi and Punjabi and he is the elder brother of actress Shraddha Kapoor and the nephew of actresses Padmini Kolhapure and Tejaswini Kolhapure.

Kapoor studied film making and acting course at the Lee Strasberg Theatre and Film Institute. He began his career as a disk jockey, and later went on to work as an assistant director for almost two years with director Priyadarshan in several films including Bhool Bhulaiya, Bhagam Bhag, Chup Chup Ke and Dhol. He was initially supposed to make his debut in Soham Shah's 2012 film Satte Pe Satta, which is a remake of the original Raj Sippy's action comedy ‘Satte Pe Satta’ (1982), but the film was shelved. He thus made his acting debut in 2013 with the film Shootout at Wadala alongside Anil Kapoor, John Abraham, and Kangana Ranaut. Then, he assisted Anurag Kashyap in his psychological thriller film Ugly (2014), in which he played a cameo role alongside Tejaswini Kolhapure and Ronit Roy. 
In 2022, he was arrested by 
the police for consumption of drugs and rave party in Bangalore.

Filmography

Web series

Music videos

References

External links
 

1984 births
Living people
Indian male film actors
Male actors in Hindi cinema
Male actors from Mumbai